The British Psychological Society (BPS) is a representative body for psychologists and psychology in the United Kingdom.

History 
It was founded on 24 October 1901 at University College London (UCL) as The Psychological Society, the organisation initially admitted only recognised teachers in the field of psychology.  The ten founder members were:
 Robert Armstrong-Jones
 Sophie Bryant
 W.R. Boyce Gibson
 Frank Noel Hales
 William McDougall
 Frederick Walker Mott
 William Halse Rivers Rivers
 Alexander Faulkner Shand
 William George Smith
 James Sully

Its current name of The British Psychological Society  was taken in 1906 to avoid confusion with another group named The Psychological Society. Under the guidance of Charles Myers, membership was opened up to members of the medical profession in 1919. In 1941 the society was incorporated.

Mission 
The Society aims to raise standards of training and practice in psychology, raise public awareness of psychology, and increase the influence of psychology practice in society. Specifically it has a number of key aims, as described below.

 Setting standards of training for psychologists at graduate and undergraduate levels.
 Providing information about psychology to the public.
 Providing support to its members via its membership networks and mandatory continuing professional development.
 Hosting conferences and events.
 Preparing policy statements.
 Publishing books, journals, the monthly magazine The Psychologist, the Research Digest blog, including a free fortnightly research update, and various other publications (see below).
 Setting standards for psychological testing.
 Maintaining a History of Psychology Centre.

Organisation 
The Society is both a learned and a professional body. As such it provides support and advice on research and practice issues. It is also a Registered Charity which imposes certain constraints on what it can and cannot do. For example, it cannot campaign on issues which are seen as party political. The BPS is not the statutory regulation body for Practitioner Psychologists in the UK which is the Health and Care Professions Council.

The Society has a large number of specialist and regional branches throughout the United Kingdom. It holds its Annual Conference, usually in May, in a different town or city each year. In addition, each of the sub-sections hold their own conferences and there is also a range of specialist meetings convened to consider relevant issues.

The Society is also a publishing body publishing a range of specialist journals, books and reports.

Membership grades and post-nominals 
In 2019 the BPS had 60,604 members and subscribers, in all fields of psychology, 20,243 of whom were Chartered Members. There are a number of grades of members:

 Members
 Student member (no post-nominal): The grade for students of psychology.
 Graduate Member (GMBPsS): Awarded to graduates of an undergraduate degree accredited by the society, or have completed an accredited conversion course.
 Full Member (FMBPsS): awarded to those with qualification in psychology and working in the field of psychology
 Associate Member (AMBPsS): awarded to wellbeing practitioners

 Fellows
 Associate Fellow (AFBPsS): Associate Fellowship may be awarded to nominees who have satisfied one of the following conditions since first becoming eligible for graduate membership:
 i) achieved eligibility for full membership of one of the society's divisions and been successfully engaged in the professional application of a specialised knowledge of psychology for an aggregate of at least two calendar years full-time (or its part-time equivalent); or
 ii) possess a research qualification in psychology and been engaged in the application, discovery, development or dissemination of psychological knowledge or practice for an aggregate of at least four years full time (or its part time equivalent); or
 iii) published psychological works or exercised specialised psychological knowledge of a standard not less than in 1 or 2 above.
 Fellow (FBPsS): Fellowship may be awarded to nominees who have made an outstanding contribution to psychology (see :Category:Fellows of the British Psychological Society) by satisfying the following criteria:
 i) been engaged in work of a psychological nature (other than undergraduate training) for a total period of at least 10 years; and
 ii) possess an advanced knowledge of psychology in at least one of its fields; and
 iii) made an outstanding contribution to the advancement or dissemination of psychological knowledge or practice either by your own research, teaching, publications or public service, or by organising and developing the work of others.
 Honorary Fellow (HonFBPsS):  Honorary Fellowship is awarded for distinguished service in the field of psychology.

Professional qualifications

CPsychol: Chartered Psychologist - Following the receipt of a royal charter in 1965, the society became the keeper of the Register of Chartered Psychologists. The register was the means by which the Society could regulate the professional practice of psychology. Regulation included the awarding of practising certificates and the conduct of disciplinary proceedings. The register ceased to be when statutory regulation of psychologists began on 1 July 2009. The profession is now regulated by the Health and Care Professions Council.  A member of the British Psychological Society (MBPsS) who has achieved chartered status has the right to the letters "CPsychol" after his or her name.
CSci: Chartered Scientist - The Society is licensed by the Science Council for the registration of Chartered Scientists.
EuroPsy: European Psychologist - The Society is a member of the European Federation of Psychologists' Associations (EFPA), and can award this designation to Chartered Psychologists.

Presidents

Honorary members and fellows

Honorary members
The following persons have been honorary members of the society:

1904 John Hughlings Jackson
1905 Harald Høffding, Sir Francis Galton, William James, Georg Elias Müller, Théodule Armand Ribot, Carl Stumpf
1910 James Sully
1911 Oswald Külpe
1912 Franz Brentano, James Ward
1926 Edward Claparède, Sigmund Freud, Gerardus Heymans, Pierre Janet, Henri Piéron, Edward Lee Thorndike, Edward Bradford Titchener, Hendrik Zwaardemaker
1927 Baron Albert Eduard Michotte van den Berck
1928 Mary Whiton Calkins
1932 James Rowland Angell, James McKeen Cattell, Sante de Sanctis, William Stern
1934 Havelock Ellis, Ernest Jones, Felix Krueger, William McDougall, Conwy Lloyd Morgan, Charles Samuel Myers, Alexander Faulkner Shand, Charles Edward Spearman, George Frederick William Stout
1937 Samuel Alexander, Henry Head, Charles Scott Sherrington
1940 Georges Dumas, Beatrice Edgell, Kurt Koffka, Carl Emil Seashore

In 1946 all surviving honorary members were made honorary fellows.

Honorary fellows 
The following persons are or have been honorary fellows of the society:

Society publications

Journals 

The BPS publishes 11 journals:

 British Journal of Clinical Psychology
 British Journal of Developmental Psychology
 British Journal of Educational Psychology
 British Journal of Health Psychology
 British Journal of Mathematical and Statistical Psychology
 British Journal of Psychology
 British Journal of Social Psychology
 Journal of Neuropsychology
 Journal of Occupational and Organizational Psychology
 Legal and Criminological Psychology
 Psychology and Psychotherapy: Theory, Research and Practice
 Counselling Psychology Review

Special Group in Coaching Psychology publications:
 International Coaching Psychology Review
 The Coaching Psychologist

The Psychologist 
The Psychologist is a members' monthly magazine that has been published since 1988, superseding the BPS Bulletin.

The Research Digest 
Since 2003 the BPS has published reports on new psychology research in the form of a free fortnightly email, and since 2005, also in the form of an online blog – both are referred to as the BPS Research Digest. As of 2014, the BPS states that the email has over 32,000 subscribers and the Digest blog attracts hundreds of thousands of page views a month. In 2010 the Research Digest blog won "best psychology blog" in the inaugural Research Blogging Awards. The Research Digest has been written and edited by psychologist Christian Jarrett since its inception About usResearch into the mental health of prisoners, digested

Books
The Society publishes a series of textbooks in collaboration with Wiley-Blackwell. These cover most of the core areas of psychology.

Member networks: Sections, divisions, branches and groups 
The British Psychological Society currently has ten divisions and nineteen sections. Divisions and sections differ in that the former are open to practitioners in a certain field of psychology, so professional and qualified psychologists only will be entitled to full membership of a division, whereas the latter are interest groups comprising members of the BPS who are interested in a particular academic aspect of psychology.

Divisions
The divisions include:
Division of Academics, Researchers and Teachers in Psychology
Division of Clinical Psychology
Division of Counselling Psychology
Division of Educational and Child Psychology
Division of Forensic Psychology
Division of Health Psychology
Division of Neuropsychology
Division of Occupational Psychology
Division of Sport and Exercise Psychology
Scottish Division of Educational Psychology

The Division of Clinical Psychology is the largest division within the BPS – it is subdivided into thirteen faculties:
Addiction
Children, Young People and their Families
Clinical Health Psychology
Eating Disorders
Forensic Clinical Psychology
HIV and Sexual Health
Holistic Psychology
Leadership and Management
Intellectual Disabilities
Oncology and Palliative Care
Perinatal Psychology
Psychosis and Complex Mental Health
Psychology of Older People

Sections
The Sections currently include:

Note: The term 'division' in the American Psychological Association does not have the same meaning as it does in the British Psychological Society, coming closer to what the British Psychological Society refers to as 'sections'. Branches are for members in the same geographical region.

Special groups 
BPS currently has the following special groups to provide a forum for members working in particular specialist fields, with a particular focus on training, practice, and professional development

Regional Branches
The Society also organises regional branches throughout the United Kingdom.  These include the following branches: 
 East Midlands Branch
 East of England Branch
 London and Home Counties Branch
 North East of England Branch
 North West of England Branch
 Northern Ireland Branch
 Scottish Branch
 South West of England Branch
 Welsh Branch
 Wessex Branch
 West Midlands Branch

Statutory regulation 

BPS has been concerned with the question of statutory registration of psychologists since the 1930s. It received its charter in 1965 and an amendment in 1987 which allowed it to maintain a register of psychologists. The UK government announced its intention to widen statutory regulation, to include inter alia psychologists, following a number of scandals arising in the 1990s in the psychotherapy field.  The BPS was in favour of statutory regulation, but opposed the proposed regulator, the Health Professions Council (HPC), preferring the idea of a new Psychological Professions Council which would map quite closely onto its own responsibilities. The government resisted this, however, and in June 2009, under the Health Care and Associated Professions (Miscellaneous Amendments) Order, regulation of most of the psychology professions passed to the HCPC, the renamed Health and Care Professions Council.

Society offices 
The Society's main office is currently in Leicester in the United Kingdom. According to BPS HR department, as of April 2019 there were 113 staff members at the Leicester office, 9 in London. There are also smaller regional offices in Belfast, Cardiff, Glasgow. The archives are deposited at the Wellcome Library in the Euston Road, London.

Logo and YouTube 
The British Psychological Society's logo is an image of the Greek mythical figure Psyche, personification of the soul, holding a Victorian oil lamp. The use of her image is a reference to the origins of the word psychology. The lamp symbolises learning and is also a reference to the story of Psyche. Eros was in love with Psyche and would visit her at night, but had forbidden her from finding out his identity. She was persuaded by her jealous sisters to discover his identity by holding a lamp to his face as he slept. Psyche accidentally burnt him with oil from the lamp, and he awoke and flew away.

The Society has its own YouTube channel.

See also 
 Association for Psychological Science
 Association of Business Psychologists
 List of psychologists
 Spearman Medal
 BPS Barbara Wilson Lifetime Achievement Award

References

External links 
 
 History of the British Psychological Society
BPS History of Psychology Centre

 
Organizations established in 1901
Learned societies of the United Kingdom
Charities based in Leicestershire
1901 establishments in the United Kingdom
Scientific societies based in the United Kingdom
Psychology organisations based in the United Kingdom
Professional associations based in the United Kingdom
Mental health organisations in the United Kingdom